The 2016–17 Boise State Broncos men's basketball team represented Boise State University during the 2016–17 NCAA Division I men's basketball season. The Broncos, led by seventh year head coach Leon Rice, played their home games at Taco Bell Arena as a member of the Mountain West Conference. They finished the season 20–12, 12–6 in Mountain West play to finish in third place. They lost in the quarterfinals of the Mountain West tournament to San Diego State. They received an invitation to the National Invitation Tournament where they defeated Utah in the first round before losing in the second round to Illinois.

Previous season
The Broncos finished the season 20–12, 11–7 in Mountain West play to finish in third place. They lost in the first round of the Mountain West tournament to Colorado State. Despite having 20 wins, they did not participate in a postseason tournament after declining an invitation from the inaugural Vegas 16.

Departures

Incoming Transfers

Recruiting

Roster

Schedule and results

|-
!colspan=9 style=| Costa Rica foreign tour

|-
!colspan=9 style=| Exhibition

|- 
!colspan=9 style=|Non-conference regular season

|-
!colspan=9 style=|Mountain West regular season

|-
!colspan=9 style=| Mountain West tournament

|-
!colspan=9 style=| NIT

References

Boise State Broncos men's basketball seasons
Boise State
Boise State
Boise
Boise